Manuel Quijano may refer to:

Manuel Quijano, Spanish singer, member of the group Café Quijano
Manuel Quijano (composer) (died 1838), Spanish composer